Vincenzo Fardella di Torrearsa (16 July 1808 – 12 January 1889) was an Italian statesman who become President of the Senate after Italian unification.

Life 
Born in Trapani, was Count and Marquis of Torrearsa. He was a protagonist of the Italian Risorgimento. In Sicilian revolution of 1848 was president of Sicilian Parliament. Fardella was then in exile in Turin, London and Nice.

In 1860 following the expedition of Giuseppe Garibaldi's Mille was minister in the Dictatorship of Garibaldi.
In 1861 he was elected Member of Italian Chamber of Deputies and soon after appointed Senator of the Kingdom.

In 1870, after the capture of Rome, he was elected president of the Senate of Italy, the first in Palazzo Madama, until 1874.

References

1808 births
1889 deaths
People from Trapani
Members of the Senate of the Kingdom of Italy
Presidents of the Italian Senate
Margraves of Italy
Members of the Sicilian Parliament
19th-century Italian politicians
Members of the Chamber of Deputies (Kingdom of Italy)